Himalaya College of Engineering is a private engineering college that was established in the year 2000. It is affiliated with the Institute of Engineering of Tribhuvan University, Nepal.

The college is located at Chyasal, Lalitpur. Before June 2012, it was situated in Shankhamul, Kathmandu, and Buddhanagar. The new building covers an area of 6100 square meters (12 ropani).

The college offers various engineering courses relating to Civil Engineering, Electronics Information & Communication Engineering, Computer Engineering, and Bachelors in Architecture. The college also has B.Sc. CSIT (Bachelor of Science in Computer Science And Information Technology) and BCA (Bachelor in Computer Application) courses affiliated with Tribhuvan University.

Himalaya College of Engineering has a six-story main academic building, a cafeteria, a project building, and two buildings for laboratories and workshops. It is one of the top-ranked private engineering institutions in Nepal.

External links
 Himalaya College of Engineering(HCOE)

Sites:
 Robotics Club Himalaya College of Engineering
 PRASPHUTAN Wall Magazine Himalaya College of Engineering
 Engineering Literature Society HCOE
 Open Source Software Community Himalaya College of Engineering
 Himalaya College of Engineering Students' Council
 Himalaya College of Engineering Electronics club'''

Engineering universities and colleges in Nepal
Lalitpur District, Nepal
2000 establishments in Nepal